Two ships of the Royal Navy have borne the name HMS Jonquil, after the flower:

  was an  sloop launched in 1915 and sold in May 1920 to Portugal, becoming Portuguese warship NRP Carvalho Araújo, discarded 1959.
  was a  launched in 1940 and sold in 1946 becoming the mercantile Lemnos

Royal Navy ship names